Millsap High School is a public high school located in Millsap, Texas, United States.  It is part of the Millsap Independent School District serving students in southwest Parker County and classified as a 3A school by the UIL.  In 2013, the school was rated "Met Standard" by the Texas Education Agency.

Notable alumni

Casey James - Country singer and American Idol contestant.

References

External links
Millsap ISD

Schools in Parker County, Texas
Public high schools in Texas